Séverine Bonal (born 13 February 1972) is a French archer. She competed at the 1992 Summer Olympics and the 1996 Summer Olympics.

References

1972 births
Living people
French female archers
Olympic archers of France
Archers at the 1992 Summer Olympics
Archers at the 1996 Summer Olympics
Sportspeople from Montpellier
20th-century French women